The Roskamp reaction was first discovered by Eric J. Roskamp and co-workers in 1989. This reaction is very useful in synthesizing β-keto esters from aldehydes and diazoacetate, using various Lewis acids as catalysts (such as BF3, SnCl2, GeCl2).

The two most noteworthy aspects of the Roskamp reaction are mild conditions and selectivity. Usually it only takes no more than one hour at room temperature to completely convert the starting materials to products.

Background
The first paper about the Roskamp reaction was published in The Journal of Organic Chemistry in 1989. At the very beginning, they proposed that the reaction would convert aldehydes to alkenes via a pseudo-Wittig type reaction. However, β-keto esters were the only products they observed.

In their first published paper, they observed that aliphatic aldehydes always have higher yield than aromatic aldehydes because of enolization. Also, the mild reaction conditions shows advantages in preventing side reactions and increasing functional group tolerance.

Then in 1992, Roskamp and co-workers expanded the scope of diazoacetate to diazo sulfones, diazo phosphonates and diazo phosphine oxides.

Mechanism
Diazo compounds are ambiphilic reagents. According to its resonance structure, the carbon adjacent to the diazo group has partial negative charge. If R’ = H, this can be regarded as a hydride-transfer process.

Roskamp-Feng Reaction
Because the α-diazocarbonyl compounds can serve as a Michael-type or aldo-type nucleophile, it is a good way to develop asymmetric reactions. In 2009, Keiji Maruoka from Kyoto University reported a Lewis acid catalyzed asymmetric Roskamp reaction. The chiral information is introduced by chiral auxiliaries from substrates.

Despite being catalytic, the previous examples rely on chiral auxiliaries for chiral information introduction. The Feng group developed a chiral Sc-catalyzed enantioselective Roskamp reaction which is a much more economical method.

The Roskamp-Feng reaction, named after Eric J. Roskamp and Xiaoming Feng, is an enantioselective chemical reaction between aldehydes and alkyl diazoacetates to prepare chiral β-keto esters.

The Roskamp reaction is well known for its mild reaction condition and high conversion rates as well as broad substrate scope. In 2010, Xiaoming Feng used special N,N’-dioxide-Sc(OTF)3 chiral ligands (0.05 mol %) to realize the first case of an asymmetric Roskamp reaction. The reaction was performed well over a series of substrates, giving the desired products chemoselectively in excellent yields (up to 99%) and enantioselectivities (up to 98% ee) under mild conditions.

Their best ligand:

The disadvantage is that the substrate can only be aromatic aldehydes. However, Roskamp-Feng Reaction is still very meaningful in synthesizing chiral 1,3-diol by reduction of keto ester, which is a very useful building block in natural product synthesis.

Chiral N,N’-dioxide ligands

Structure:

Advantages:
 Ready availability
 The reactions of tertiary amines or pyridine with peracids such as m-CPBA and hydrogen peroxide easily generate the corresponding N-oxides.
 Compatible with a wide variety of metals, including (Sc3+, Y3+, La3+, Nd3+, Sm3+, Eu3+, Gd3+, Yb3+), transition metals (Ti4+, Fe3+, Fe2+, Co2+, Ni2+, Cu2+, Ag+) and main group metals(Mg2+).
 In a number of asymmetric reactions, N,N′- dioxide–metal complexes allow for a remarkable stereochemical outcome under mild reaction conditions.

Other asymmetric Roskamp reactions
In 2012, Do Hyun Ryu from Sungkyunkwan University developed a catalytic, asymmetric Roskamp Reaction with broad applicability. They used the oxazaborolidinium ion Lewis acid catalysts, which are generated from the corresponding oxazaborolidine by protonation with triflic acid.

The advantage of this reaction compared to Feng's, is its broad scope of aldehydes. Long-chain heptaldehyde, as well as more sterically hindered isopropyl and cyclohexyl carboxaldehydes all successfully reacted with diazoester to provide the corresponding products.

In 2015, the same group reported asymmetric Roskamp reaction of the α-aryl diazo Weinreb amide, using the same chiral oxazaborolidine catalyst. The reaction is useful because Weinreb amide can be converted to ketones easily.

See also
 Meerwein arylation - also sees substitution of a diazonium compound by a carbon centre

References 

Chemical reactions
Name reactions